Xanthone is an organic compound with the molecular formula O[C6H4]2CO. It is a white solid.

In 1939, xanthone was introduced as an insecticide and it currently finds uses as ovicide for codling moth eggs and as a larvicide.  Xanthone is also used in the preparation of xanthydrol, which is used in the determination of urea levels in the blood. It can also be used as a photocatalyst.

Synthesis 
Xanthone can be prepared by the heating of phenyl salicylate:

Six methods have been reported for synthesizing xanthone derivatives:

The Michael-Kostanecki method uses an equimolar mix of a polyphenol and an O-hydroxybenzoic acid, which are heated with a dehydrating agent.
The Friedel-Crafts method has a benzophenone intermediate.
The Robinson-Nishikawa method is a variant of the Hoesch synthesis but with low yields.
The Asahina-Tanase method synthesizes some methoxylated xanthones, and xanthones with acid-sensitive substituents.
The Tanase method is used to synthesize polyhydroxyxanthones.
The Ullman method condenses a phenol with an O-chlorobenzene and cyclizes the resulting diphenylether.

Xanthone derivatives
Xanthone forms the  core of a variety of natural products, such as mangostin or lichexanthone.  These compounds are sometimes referred to as xanthones or xanthonoids.  Over 200 natural xanthones have been identified.  Many are phytochemicals found in plants in the families Bonnetiaceae, Clusiaceae, and Podostemaceae. They are also found in some species of the genus Iris.  Some xanthones are found in the pericarp of the mangosteen fruit (Garcinia mangostana) as well as in the bark and timber of Mesua thwaitesii.

Bone fide agents include AH 7614 & TUG-1387.

See also
 Tetrahydroxanthones
 Thioxanthone
 Xanthene

References

Insecticides